Palar Nagar is a village situated in Kolar Gold Fields of Kolar district of Karnataka State in India.     
It is near Aalamaram.

References 

Villages in Kolar district